Unleashed is a paranormal/suspense novel written by American author Sara Humphreys. Published in 2011, it is the first book in her The Amoveo Legend Series, which to date has 7 titles.

Plot summary
Samantha Logan is a struggling artist whose career in New York City is not going the way she wants.  She must move back to her hometown of Westerly, RI and move in with her grandmother.  For a while she's been having dreams about a mysterious man.  Much to her surprise the man of her dreamworld is her grandmother's next door neighbor, Malcolm Drew.

Malcolm Drew is a member of an ancient race of shapeshifters called the Amoveo.  But the biggest secret of all is that he tells Samantha that she is also an Amoveo, a hybrid.  Her father was an Amoveo and her mother was a human with psychic powers.  The Amoevo race is dying out and now a new chapter is beginning with humans being lifemates.  But in the background of Samantha and Malcolm's budding romance a war is brewing among the Amoveo, one that will put the two of them in the middle.

Awards
Grave Tells Reader's Choice Award 2011 Favorite Paranormal Romance

References

Amoveo Legend
2011 American novels
Novels set in New York City
Sourcebooks books